Frederick Terrell Jones (born March 11, 1979) is an American former professional basketball player. He played college basketball for the Oregon Ducks and was the winner of the NBA Slam Dunk Contest at the 2004 NBA All-Star Game.

Early career
Born in Malvern, Arkansas, Fred Jones moved to Portland, Oregon in middle school and became the Oregon High School Player of the Year in both his Junior and Senior years for Sam Barlow High School in Gresham, a suburb of Portland.  He then went on to play four seasons at the University of Oregon, where, during his senior year, he led the Ducks to the Elite Eight, with the help of PG Luke Ridnour and G/F Luke Jackson.  While widely considered to be an underachiever during his first three years at Oregon, Jones jumped onto the national radar screen as a senior, becoming a candidate for Pac-10 Player of the Year and averaging 18.6 points per game.

Professional career

NBA 
Jones was the 14th pick in the 2002 NBA draft by the Indiana Pacers. He was drafted by Isiah Thomas. He played sparingly as a rookie, averaging only 1.2 points per game in 19 appearances while playing behind Reggie Miller.  That scoring average increased to nearly 5 points per game in his second year while appearing in 81 games.  He more than doubled his averages during the 2004–05 season (to 10.6 ppg), partly due to teammate and small forward Ron Artest being suspended for the season for his involvement in The Malice at The Palace incident.  In his first start after the incident, Jones scored a career-high 31 points against the Orlando Magic, establishing himself as one of the team's primary scoring weapons.

In 2004, he won the NBA Slam Dunk Contest, beating out two-time champion Jason Richardson, but did not compete in the contest again.

On November 23, 2004, against the Boston Celtics, Jones recorded his first double double, with 16 points and a career-high 10 rebounds.

In the 2006 off-season, the Toronto Raptors signed Jones. On February 22, 2007, the Raptors traded Jones to the Portland Trail Blazers in exchange for guard Juan Dixon.

Jones, along with Zach Randolph and Dan Dickau, was traded to the New York Knicks on June 28, 2007, for Channing Frye and Steve Francis. The trade reunited Jones with New York Knicks head coach Isiah Thomas, the man who drafted him. The Knicks did not re-sign him after the year.

On December 28, 2008, Jones signed with the Los Angeles Clippers as a free agent. He was waived on January 5, 2009, however three days later he was again signed by the Clippers to a 10-day contract. On January 28, 2009, Jones received news that the Clippers would re-sign him for the rest of the season, which they did the following day.

Jones' final NBA game was on April 15, 2009 in a 85 - 126 loss to the Oklahoma City Thunder where he recorded 8 points and 5 assists.

Italy 
In August 2009 Jones signed with Italian team Pallacanestro Biella.

China
On November 3, 2010, it was announced that Fred Jones had signed a contract to play for the Guangdong Southern Tigers of the Chinese Basketball Association. He was waived in January 2011.

Coaching career
Jones returned to Oregon to complete his degree and was an undergraduate assistant coach for the Ducks in 2015–16.

Outside the basketball court
Jones operated a Sneakers store namely Luxury Sneaker Exchange.

NBA career statistics

Regular season 

|-
| align="left" | 
| align="left" | Indiana
| 19 || 1 || 6.1 || .375 || .286 || .750 || .5 || .3 || .3 || .1 || 1.2
|-
| align="left" | 
| align="left" | Indiana
| 81 || 2 || 18.6 || .395 || .303 || .832 || 1.6 || 2.1 || .8 || .2 || 4.9
|-
| align="left" | 
| align="left" | Indiana
| 77 || 14 || 29.5 || .425 || .380 || .850 || 3.1 || 2.5 || .8 || .4 || 10.6
|-
| align="left" | 
| align="left" | Indiana
| 68 || 2 || 27.0 || .417 || .337 || .763 || 2.5 || 2.3 || .8 || .3 || 9.6
|-
| align="left" | 
| align="left" | Toronto
| 39 || 9 || 22.3 || .386 || .317 || .830 || 2.1 || 1.4 || .8 || .3 || 7.6
|-
| align="left" | 
| align="left" | Portland
| 24 || 3 || 18.7 || .384 || .259 || .846 || 1.4 || 2.2 || .8 || .2 || 4.8
|-
| align="left" | 
| align="left" | New York
| 70 || 26 || 25.1 || .421 || .385 || .746 || 2.4 || 2.4 || .7 || .3 || 7.6
|-
| align="left" | 
| align="left" | L.A. Clippers
| 52 || 21 || 28.8 || .407 || .367 || .815 || 2.4 || 3.6 || 1.0 || .2 || 7.3
|- class="sortbottom"
| style="text-align:center;" colspan="2"| Career
| 430 || 78 || 24.0 || .411 || .353 || .809 || 2.2 || 2.3 || .8 || .3 || 7.5

Playoffs 

|-
| align="left" | 2004
| align="left" | Indiana
| 14 || 0 || 18.8 || .490 || .500 || .714 || 2.4 || 1.1 || .5 || .5 || 4.7
|-
| align="left" | 2005
| align="left" | Indiana
| 13 || 0 || 18.0 || .296 || .391 || .923 || 1.8 || 1.0 || .6 || .2 || 4.1
|-
| align="left" | 2006
| align="left" | Indiana
| 6 || 1 || 27.8 || .417 || .375 || .917 || 3.3 || 2.5 || 1.0 || .2 || 7.8
|- class="sortbottom"
| style="text-align:center;" colspan="2"| Career
| 33 || 1 || 20.1 || .397 || .426 || .875 || 2.3 || 1.3 || .6 || .3 || 5.0

References

External links

1979 births
Living people
African-American basketball players
American expatriate basketball people in Canada
American expatriate basketball people in China
American expatriate basketball people in Italy
American men's basketball players
Basketball players from Arkansas
Basketball players from Portland, Oregon
Guangdong Southern Tigers players
Indiana Pacers draft picks
Indiana Pacers players
New York Knicks players
Oregon Ducks men's basketball players
Pallacanestro Biella players
People from Malvern, Arkansas
Portland Trail Blazers players
Shooting guards
Toronto Raptors players
21st-century African-American sportspeople
20th-century African-American sportspeople